Scurria variabilis is a species of sea snail, a true limpet, a marine gastropod mollusk in the family Lottiidae, one of the families of true limpets.

Description

Distribution

References

 Ramírez-Böhme [= Ramírez Boehme] J. (1974) Nuevas especies chilenas de Lucapina, Fissurella y Collisella (Mollusca, Archaeogastropoda). Boletin, Museo Nacional de Historia Natural [Santiago de Chile] 33: 15-34.
 Ni IH. & Qian PY. (1999). Study on the suitability of Shelter Island Area to be established as marine park or marine reserve. Final report. Submitted to the Agriculture, Fisheries & Conservation Department, The Hong Kong SAR Government.
 Nakano T. & Ozawa T. (2007). Worldwide phylogeography of limpets of the order Patellogastropoda: molecular, morphological and paleontological evidence. Journal of Molluscan Studies 73(1): 79–99

External links
 Gray, J. E. & Sowerby, G. B. I. (1839). Molluscous animals and their shells. Pp. 103-155, pls 33-34 [pp. 103-142 by J. E. Gray, 143-155 by G. B. Sowerby I. In: The zoology of Capt. Beechey's voyage, compiled from the collections on notes made by Captain Beechey, the officers and naturalist of the expedition during a voyage to the Pacific and Behring's straits in his Majesty's ship Blossom, under the command of Captain F. W. Beechey in the years 1825, 26, 27 and 28. London pp. XII + 186 + 44 pl. ]
 Philippi, R.A. (1846). Diagnosen einiger neuen Conchylien-Arten. Zeitschrift für Malakozoologie. 3(2): 19–24 [28 February; 3(4): 49–55 ]
 Marincovich, L. (1973). Intertidal Mollusks of Iquique, Chile. Los Angeles Co. Museum of Natural History, Science Bulletin. 16: 1-49, 102 figs
 Gould, A. A. (1846). Descriptions of new shells, collected by the United States Exploring Expedition. Proceedings of the Boston Society of Natural History. 2: 141-145, 148-152
  Reeve, L. A. (1854-1855). Monograph of the genus Patella. In: Conchologia Iconica, or, illustrations of the shells of molluscous animals, vol. 8, pls 1-42 and unpaginated tex. L. Reeve & Co., London.

Lottiidae
Gastropods described in 1839